Mohamed Amine Dennoun (born 9 May 1986 in Marseille, France) is a French-Algerian footballer. He last played for ASO Chlef in the Algerian Ligue Professionnelle 1 before being released by the club.

Club career
On 6 July 2010 Dennoun joined Aviron Bayonnais FC on a free transfer after being released by Marseille.

On 28 December 2011 Dennoun was released from ASO Chlef, failing to make any appearances for the club during his 6-month stint.

External links

References

1986 births
Living people
French footballers
Olympique de Marseille players
FC Libourne players
Amiens SC players
French sportspeople of Algerian descent
Algerian footballers
Ligue 1 players
Ligue 2 players
Footballers from Marseille
Aviron Bayonnais FC players
ASO Chlef players
Association football midfielders